is a passenger railway station located in the city of Tokorozawa, Saitama, Japan, operated by the private railway operator Seibu Railway.

Lines
All services except Chichibu and Musashi limited express as well as the S-Train services stop at this station.

Station layout
The station consists of two ground-level island platforms serving four tracks.

Platforms

Facilities and accessibility
Toilet facilities are located on the elevated concourse, inside the ticket barriers. Escalator and lift access is provided to and from both sets of platforms.

History
The station opened on 20 November 1970.

Station numbering was introduced on all Seibu Railway lines during fiscal 2012, with Kotesashi Station becoming "SI19".

Passenger statistics
In fiscal 2019, the station was the 43rd busiest on the Seibu network with an average of 48,781 passengers daily.  The passenger figures for previous years are as shown below.

Surrounding area
Seibu's Kotesashi Depot is located to the north of the tracks immediately to the west of the station.

South side

 
 Waseda University Tokorozawa Campus
 Saitama Prefectural Tokorozawa Nishi High School
 Saitama Prefectural High School  of the Arts
 Tokorozawa Municipal Kitano Junior High School
 Tokorozawa Municipal Kotesashi Junior High School
 National Hospital Organization Nishisaitama Chuo National Hospital

North side

 Shin-Tokorozawa Station (Seibu Shinjuku Line)

See also
 List of railway stations in Japan

References

External links

 Kotesashi Station information (Seibu Railway) 

Railway stations in Saitama Prefecture
Railway stations in Japan opened in 1970
Seibu Ikebukuro Line
Railway stations in Tokorozawa, Saitama